Sarmanto is a surname. Notable people with the surname include:

Heikki Sarmanto (born 1939), Finnish jazz musician and composer
Pekka Sarmanto (born 1945), Finnish jazz musician

References